Pykhmarevo is a rural locality (a village) in Dvinitskoye Rural Settlement, Sokolsky District, Vologda Oblast, Russia. The population was 12 as of 2002.

Geography 
Pykhmarevo is located 45 km northeast of Sokol (the district's administrative centre) by road. Osipovo is the nearest rural locality.

References 

Rural localities in Sokolsky District, Vologda Oblast